

Men's competition

Flyweight (– 52 kg)

Bantamweight (– 56 kg)

Featherweight (– 60 kg)

Lightweight (– 67.5 kg)

Middleweight (– 75 kg)

Light-heavyweight (– 82.5 kg)

Middle-heavyweight (– 90 kg)

First-heavyweight (– 100 kg)

Heavyweight (– 110 kg)

Super heavyweight (+ 110 kg)

Medal table

Events at the 1987 Pan American Games
Pan American Games
1987